Nicolas Jules Chabot de Bouin (Chef-Boutonne, 5 September 1807 – Paris 1857) was a French writer, novelist and playwright of the 19th century.

He composed both under his name and under the pseudonyms  Jules Pecharel, Michel Morin and Octave de Saint-Ernest.

His plays were presented on several Parisian stages of his time, such as the Théâtre des Variétés, the Théâtre de la Porte-Saint-Martin, the Théâtre des Folies-Dramatiques, the Théâtre de l'Ambigu-Comique, the Théâtre de la Renaissance, the Théâtre du Gymnase, the Théâtre de Madame,  and the Théâtre du Panthéon.

Works 

1827: La Marraine, comédie vaudeville in 1 act, with Lockroy and Eugène Scribe
1829: La Jeune Fille et la Veuve, comédie-vaudeville in 1 act, with Jean-François-Alfred Bayard
1832: La Mouche du mari, comédie-vaudeville in 1 act, with Philippe Dumanoir
1832: Le Fils du savetier, ou les Amours de Télémaque, vaudeville in 1 act, with Achille d'Artois
1833: Le Gil-Blas du théâtre, under Michel Morin
1834: Élie Tobias, histoire allemande de 1516
1834: La Vieille Fille, comédie vaudeville in 1 act, with Bayard
1835: Histoire de deux sœurs
1836: Les Deux Étoiles, ou les Petites Causes et les Grands Effets, vaudeville philosophique in 3 acts
1836: Le Moutard des faubourgs, vaudeville in 1 act, under Jules Pecharel
1837: Giuseppo, drama in 5 acts, with Auguste-Louis-Désiré Boulé
1837: Le Matelot à terre, croquis de marine in 1 act, with Jules-Édouard Alboize de Pujol
1837: Rita l'espagnole, drama in 4 acts, with Boulé, Charles Desnoyer and Eugène Sue
1837: Le Roi de carreau, vaudeville in 1 act, with Victor Masselin
1838: La Maîtresse d'un ami, comédie-vaudeville in 1 act, with Desnoyer
1838: Adriane Ritter, drama in 5 acts
1840: Paula, drama in 5 acts, with Boulé
1841: Le Beau-Père, comédie-vaudeville, with Eugène Cormon
1841: L'Hospitalité, vaudeville in 1 act, with Cormon
1841: Le Quinze avant midi, comédie-vaudeville in 1 act, with Cormon, 1841
1842: Physiologie de la première nuit des noces, under Octave de Saint-Ernest
1843: Les Naufrageurs de Kérougal, drama in 4 acts, with Boulé and Saint-Yves
1844: Jeanne, drama in 6 parts and 2 periods, with Boulé and Louis-Nicolas Brette Saint-Ernest, 1844
1846: Vingt francs par jour, comédie-vaudeville in 2 acts, with Cormon
1846: Nouvelle grammaire conjugale, ou Principes généraux didactiques, à l'aide desquels on peut conduire et dresser une femme, la faire marcher au doigt et à l’œil, la rendre souple comme un gant et douce comme un mouton, précédés de considérations sur l'amour, les femmes et le mariage, under Octave de Saint-Ernest
 La Quête des volailles, comédie-vaudeville in 1 act

Bibliography 
 Louis Gustave Vapereau, Dictionnaire universel des contemporains, 1865, (p. 353)
 Edmond-Denis De Manne, Nouveau dictionnaire des ouvrages anonymes et pseudonymes, 1868, (p. 149)
 Georges d'Heylli, Dictionnaire des pseudonymes, 1869, (p. 260)
 Jules Gay, Analectes du bibliophile, 1876, (p. 186)
 Maurice Poignat, Le pays mellois, 1982, (p. 174)

19th-century French dramatists and playwrights
19th-century French novelists
People from Deux-Sèvres
1807 births
1857 deaths